HMS Scarborough was a 74-gun third rate ship of the line of the Royal Navy, launched on 29 March 1812 at Harwich.

Scarborough was sold out of the Navy in 1836.

Notes

References

Lavery, Brian (2003) The Ship of the Line - Volume 1: The development of the battlefleet 1650-1850. Conway Maritime Press. .

Ships of the line of the Royal Navy
Vengeur-class ships of the line
1812 ships
Ships built in Harwich